Leibertingen is a municipality  in the district of Sigmaringen in Baden-Württemberg, Germany.

Geography

Geographical location 
Leibertingen is located 600 to 850 meters above sea level directly over the Danube valley in the Heuberg region, a plateau at the southern bound corner of the Swabian Jura, with a distance of 22 km to Sigmaringen and 24 km to Tuttlingen and belongs to the Naturpark Obere Donau. Of the total area of around 4720 hectares (as of Dec. 31 2010), 2127 hectare are forest, 2328 hectare are farmland and 257 hectares consist of residential and circulation areas. The so-called "Dreiländereck" (Eng. border triangle) is located underneath the nearby Wildenstein mountain. This is where Württemberg (Irndorf parish), Hohenzollern-Sigmaringen (Beuron parish) and Baden (Leibertingen parish) come together.

Municipality 
Leibertingen forms the name-giving municipality with the adjoining villages of Altheim, Kreenheinstetten and Thalheim.

Administration 
Leibertingen forms with the neighboring towns of Sauldorf and Meßkirch an association of its municipal administration.

History 
In historic documents Leibertingen was mentioned in the year 1275 for the first time; Altheim however already in the year 768, and Kreenheinstetten in 793.

Economy

Transport

Architecture, people and yearly events

Historical buildings 
 Burg Wildenstein

Notable people 
 Abraham a Sancta Clara (1644–1709) born at Kreenheinstetten

Yearly events 
 The "Wildensteiner Jahrmarkt"

Sport 
 Leibertingen harbors a gliding airfield, where during the year various events take place.

References

 Christoph Schmider & Edwin Ernst Weber: Kommunale und kirchliche Archivpflege im ländlichen Raum: Geschichte, Probleme und Perspektiven am Beispiel des Gemeinde- und Pfarrarchivs Kreenheinstetten. Heimatkundliche Schriftenreihe des Landkreises Sigmaringen, Band 5. Saulgau: Gebr. Edel & Co., 1997. .

External links 

 Official Homepage of Leibertingen
 Naturpark Obere Donau

Sigmaringen (district)
Baden